Kuraneh (also Romanized as Kūrāneh) is a village in Targavar Rural District, Silvaneh District, Urmia County, West Azerbaijan Province, Iran. At the 2006 census, its population was 550, in 99 families.

References 

Populated places in Urmia County